Carol Sutton may refer to:
 Carol Sutton (actress)
 Carol Sutton (journalist)
 Carol Sutton (artist)